This is a list of the princess consorts of Achaea, the consorts of the Princes of Achaea.

The Principality of Achaea had three princesses by their own rights: Isabella, Matilda, and Joan. Their husbands were not consorts. Maria II Zaccaria was princess consort and later reigning princess.

Princess consort of Achaea

House of Blois, 1205–1209

House of Villehardouin, 1209–1278

Capetian House of Anjou, 1278–1289

House of Villehardouin, 1289–1307 
None

Capetian House of Anjou, 1307–1313

House of Avesnes, 1313-1321 
None

After 1318 the title to Matilda's right to Achaea became disputed with Odo IV, Duke of Burgundy and Louis, Count of Clermont. She was stripped of her titles and hereditary rights after she wouldn't comply with her marriage to John of Gravina. Philip I of Taranto bestowed the title on John instead, bringing the title back into the Angevin inheritance, while Matilda verbally willed her right to her cousin James II of Majorca.

Capetian House of Anjou, 1321–1381

House of Baux, 1381–1383

Capetian House of Anjou, 1383–1386 

Interregnum: At Charles III's death in 1386 the principality entered an interregnum where five pretenders claimed its throne, none having a strong enough claim to be considered a ruler until Peter of Saint Superan, leader of the Navarrese Company, declared himself Prince in 1396 with the blessing of Pope Urban VI, who claimed ownership of the principality since James of Baux's heirs had forfeited their rights to the Holy See.

Non-Dynastic, 1396-1402

House of Zaccaria, 1396-1402 

Achaea was united with the Despotate of the Morea after the death of Centurione II Zaccaria.

See also
Princess of Taranto
Duchess of Athens
List of consorts of Naples
List of consorts of Anjou
List of consorts of Majorca
List of Latin Empresses

Sources
GREECE, LATIN LORDSHIPS

Achaea